The sinking date for Siston Hill Colliery, Siston, Bristol is unknown, but was probably in the late 1790s or early 19th century. There is a surviving accident report dated 1804. This names the colliery owner as a Mrs. Peterson. By 1831 the colliery was under the ownership of Toghill & Company.

The 1880 List of Mines names the owner of the pit as S. H. Hadley.

The winding engine was a Boulton and Watt, had a  stroke and a  drum, and could lift 700 to 800 tons of coal a day. The pumping engine had two  cylinders and was in working order. Above ground was a bank high enough for double screens which sorted the coal before it was loaded for transportation. A tunnel was provided at the bottom of the bank to enable timber and other materials to descend into the pit without first being hauled to the top. A  circular chimney stack towered over the colliery.

The sale was not a success and the colliery never reopened.

References 

Coal mines in Gloucestershire
Buildings and structures in South Gloucestershire District
Bristol Coalfield
Underground mines in England